Gilpinia is a genus of sawflies belonging to the family Diprionidae.

The species of this genus are found in Europe and Northern America.

Species:
 Gilpinia abieticola (Dalla Torre, 1894)
 Gilpinia catocala (Snellen van Vollenhoven, 1858)

References

Diprionidae
Sawfly genera